Gaw or GAW may refer to:

People 
 Gaw (surname), a Gaelic-language surname

Places 
 Gaw, Myanmar, a town in Thandwe District, Rakhine State
 Gaw Township, a township of Rakhine State

Other uses 
 Game & Watch, electronic handheld games produced by Nintendo
 Games Workshop, British miniature wargaming company
 Gauge adjustable wheelset
 GAW Organisation, a Senegalese cultural organization
 Global Atmosphere Watch, established by the World Meteorological Organization
 Gustav-Adolf-Werk, a society of the Evangelical Church in Germany
 Nobonob language